Pennsylvania's Attorney General election was held November 7, 2000. Necessary primary elections were held on April 4, 2000. Incumbent Mike Fisher was unopposed for the Republican nomination and won a second term by a relatively comfortable margin. Jim Eisenhower, a former Assistant U.S. Attorney and close confidant of Ed Rendell was the Democratic nominee; he earned a narrow victory in the party primary over John Morganelli, the District Attorney of Northampton County.

General election

Primary Election

References

Attorney General
2000
Pennsylvania